Manuel Díaz may refer to:

 Manuel Díaz (fencer) (1874–1929), Cuban fencer who competed at the 1904 Summer Olympics
 Manuel Diaz (tennis), Puerto Rican tennis player and coach
 Manuel Díaz (Mexican cyclist) (1899–?), Mexican cyclist who competed at the 1932 Summer Olympics
 Manuel Díaz Gil (1929–1966), Spanish footballer
 Manuel Díaz Montava (born 1957), Spanish Paralympic cyclist
 Manuel Díaz Vega (born 1954), Spanish football referee

See also
Manny Diaz (disambiguation)